Jaroslav Svozil (born 9 September 1993) is a professional Czech football player who currently plays for FC Banik Ostrava in the Czech First League.

References

External links
 
 

1993 births
Living people
Czech footballers
Czech Republic youth international footballers
Czech Republic under-21 international footballers
Association football defenders
Czech First League players
SK Sigma Olomouc players
1. SC Znojmo players
SFC Opava players
FC Baník Ostrava players